Street of Darkness is a 1958 American adventure drama directed by Robert G. Walker and starring Robert Keys. It premiered on June 11, 1958.

Premise 
Former colleagues Brett, Matt and Jesse reunite in New Orleans and embark on a search for treasure.

Cast

References

External links 
 
 
 
 

1950s adventure drama films
American adventure drama films
American black-and-white films
Treasure hunt films
1958 drama films
1958 films
1950s English-language films
1950s American films